Brassall is a suburb in the City of Ipswich, Queensland, Australia.

Geography 
Brassall has a southern boundary partially marked by the Bremer River and a western alignment along Ironpot Creek. The northern boundary follows the Warrego Highway.  Brassall now incorporates part of the old suburb of Raymonds Hill.

History 

The suburb name first appears on a plan drawn by surveyor James Warner on 6 October 1851; however, the origin of the suburb name is unknown. It was also known as Hungry Flats, as was a stop over for bullock teams that were transporting logs from Pine Mountain to Hancocks saw mill at North Ipswich.

Brassall was a separate shire (Shire of Brassall) with its own council from March 1860 until 1 January 1917 when the area became part of the City of Ipswich.

The Brisbane Valley railway line passed through Brassall. The line opened from Ipswich to Lowood on 16 June 1884, and was extended through a number of stages until it reached Yarraman on 1 May 1913. The line closed in 1993. The disused rail corridor was used to construct the Brassall Bikepath, which is part of the Brisbane Valley Rail Trail.

Brassall Provisional School opened on 10 September 1894. On 10 July 1899 it became Brassall State School.

St George's Anglican Church at 30 Waterworks Road was dedicated on 1923 by Archbishop Gerald Sharp. The altar was designed by the diocesan architects Atkinson and Conrad, and made by Mr L. Larsen of North Ipswich. The church's closure on 15 November 1988 was approved by Assistant Bishop Ray Smith.

St Mark's Lutheran Evangelican Church was originally at Gatton where it was dedicated on 29 October 1950. In 1967 the church was relocated to Brassall, where it was rededicated on 19 November 1967.

Ipswich State High School opened on 1 July 1951.

Ipswich Adventist School opened on 21 January 1968.

The suburb was officially bounded and named in 1991.

North Ipswich Uniting Church was originally located at 105 Downs Street, North Ipswich. It was previously the North Ipswich Presbyterian Church, until the Uniting Church in Australia was established in 1977.

Since 2003, Brassall has been a key development area in the city of Ipswich. Formerly bushland and farming area leading into the West Moreton district; Brassall has been extensively developed. A new estate named "Grammar Park Estate" opened in Brassall in early 2002. It has since developed significantly with investors subdividing land. A property on Henry street was bought for over $1.5 million and has since been subdivided into over 28 house blocks. Grammar Park Estate now has over 1000 houses.

Brassall is an area of Ipswich which has a higher demographic. Brassall's residents have higher levels of education than those from other suburbs. Brassall's occupants vary from retirees, young families and defence personnel.

Heritage listings 

Brassall has a number of heritage-listed sites, including
 Mihi Junction: Mihi Creek Complex
 Parker Lane: Klondyke Coke Ovens

Education
Brassall State School is a government primary (Prep-6) school for boys and girls at Pine Mountain Road. In 2018, the school had an enrolment of 811 students with 58 teachers (53 full-time equivalent) and 33 non-teaching staff (25 full-time equivalent). It includes a special education program.

Ipswich State High School is a government secondary (7-12) school for boys and girls at 1 Hunter Street. In 2018, the school had an enrolment of 1554 students with 117 teachers (114 full-time equivalent) and 70 non-teaching staff (52 full-time equivalent). It includes a special education program.

Ipswich Adventist School is a private primary (Prep-6) school for boys and girls at 56 Hunter Street. In 2018, the school had an enrolment of 107 students with 11 teachers (8 full-time equivalent) and 7 non-teaching staff (4 full-time equivalent).

Amenities 
The Ipswich City Council operates a fortnightly mobile library service which visits the shopping centre.

St Mark's Lutheran Church is at 5 Hunter Street.

Ipswich North Uniting Church (also known as Brassall Uniting Church) is at 2 Pommer Street. It is on the site of and adjacent to the former Brassall Methodist Church.

The Islamic Society of Ipswich operate a mosque at cultural centre at 30 Waterworks Road in the former St George's Anglican Church.

References

External links

 

 
Suburbs of Ipswich, Queensland